The Federal Reserve Bank of Philadelphia — also known as the Philadelphia Fed or the Philly Fed — headquartered at 10 Independence Mall in Philadelphia, Pennsylvania, is responsible for the Third District of the Federal Reserve, which covers eastern and central Pennsylvania, the nine southern counties of New Jersey, and Delaware. Its geographical territory is by far the smallest in the system, and its population base is the second-smallest (next to the Federal Reserve Bank of Minneapolis). The current President of the Philadelphia Fed is Patrick T. Harker.

The Philadelphia Fed conducts research on both the national and regional economy.  Its regional manufacturing index is the second of the regional manufacturing reports released every month (the New York Fed's Empire State Index is now released earlier), but it is still very important to the financial community as a proxy for nationwide manufacturing conditions.
The Federal Reserve Bank of Philadelphia publishes a quarterly survey of professional economic forecasters, the Survey of Professional Forecasters, also called "The Anxious Index". It is a highly predictive report on the prospects for the Economy of the United States. It also publishes a quarterly publication entitled Business Review. The Federal Reserve Bank of Philadelphia also publishes the Livingston Survey and the Greenbook data sets.

Board of Directors
The following people serve on the board of directors . Terms expire on December 31 of their final year on the board.

Class A

Class B

Class C

See also

 Federal Reserve System
 Federal Reserve Districts
 Federal Reserve Branches
 Federal Reserve Act
Old Federal Reserve Bank Building (Philadelphia)
 Structure of the Federal Reserve System

References
Notes

External links

The Philadelphia Fed's home page
A map of the third district 
Public Statements of Karl Bopp, former President of the Federal Reserve Bank of Philadelphia
Public Statements of David P. Eastburn, former President of the Federal Reserve Bank of Philadelphia

Philadelphia
Bank buildings in Philadelphia
Center City, Philadelphia